The order Notostraca, containing the single family Triopsidae, is a group of crustaceans known as tadpole shrimp or shield shrimp. The two genera, Triops and Lepidurus, are considered living fossils, with similar forms having existed since the Devonian. They have a broad, flat carapace, which conceals the head and bears a single pair of compound eyes. The abdomen is long, appears to be segmented and bears numerous pairs of flattened legs. The telson is flanked by a pair of long, thin caudal rami. Phenotypic plasticity within taxa makes species-level identification difficult, and is further compounded by variation in the mode of reproduction. Notostracans are omnivores living on the bottom of temporary pools and shallow lakes.

Description
This gives them a similar overall shape to a tadpole, from which the common name tadpole shrimp derives. The carapace is dorso-ventrally flattened, smooth, and bears no rostrum; it includes the head, and the two sessile compound eyes are located together on top of the head. The two pairs of antennae are much reduced, with the second pair sometimes missing altogether. The mouthparts comprise a pair of uniramous mandibles and no maxillipeds.

The trunk comprises a large number of "body rings", which appear to be body segments, but do not always reflect the underlying segmentation. The first eleven body rings compose the thorax and bear one pair of legs each, the last of which also bears the genital opening. In the female, it is modified to form a "brood pouch". The first one or two pairs of legs differ from the remainder, and probably function as sensory organs.

The remaining segments form the abdomen. The number of body rings is variable both within and between species, and the number of pairs of legs per body ring can rise as high as six. The legs become progressively smaller along the abdomen, with the last segments being legless.

The abdomen ends in a telson and a pair of long, thin, multi-articulate caudal rami. The form of the telson varies between the two genera: in Lepidurus, a rounded projection extends between the caudal rami, while in Triops there is no such projection.

Life cycle

Within the Notostraca, and even within species, there is variation in the mode of reproduction, with some populations reproducing sexually, some showing self-fertilisation of females, and some showing a mix of the two. The frequency of males in populations is therefore highly variable. In sexual populations, the sperm leave the male's body through simple pores, there being no penis. The eggs are released by the female and then held in the cup-like brood pouch. The eggs are retained by the female only for a short time before being laid, and the larvae develop directly, without passing through a metamorphosis.

Ecology and distribution
Notostracans are omnivorous, eating small animals such as fishes and fairy shrimp. They are found worldwide in freshwater, brackish water, or saline pools, as well as in shallow lakes, peat bogs, and moorland. The species Triops longicaudatus is considered an agricultural pest in California rice paddies, because it prevents light from reaching the rice seedlings by stirring up sediment.

Evolution and fossil record
The fossil record of Notostraca is extensive, occurring in a wide range of geological deposits. The oldest known notostracan is the species Strudops goldenbergi from the Late Devonian (Famennian ~ 365 million years ago) of Belgium. The lack of major morphological change since  has led to Notostraca being described as living fossils. Kazacharthra, a group known only from Triassic and Jurassic fossils from Kazakhstan and Western China, are closely related to notostracans, and may belong within the order Notostraca, or alternatively are placed as their sister group within the clade Calmanostraca.

The "central autapomorphy" of the Notostraca is the abandonment of filter feeding in open water, and the development of a benthic lifestyle in muddy waters, taking up food from particles of sediment and preying on small animals. A number of other characteristics are correlated with this change, including the increased size of the animal compared to its relatives, and the loss of the ability to hinge the carapace; although a central keel marks the former separation into two valves, the adductor muscle is missing. Notostracans retain the plesiomorphic condition of having two separate compound eyes, which abut, but have not become united, as seen in other groups of Branchiopoda.

Taxonomy
The extant members of order Notostraca composed a single family, Triopsidae, with only two genera, Triops and Lepidurus.
The problematic Middle Ordovician fossil Douglasocaris has been erected and placed in its own family Douglasocaridae by Caster & Brooks 1956, and may be ancestral to Notostraca.

The phenotypic plasticity shown by notostracan species make identification to the species level difficult. Many putative species have been described based on morphological variation, such that by the 1950s, as many as 70 species were recognised. Two important revisions – those of Linder in 1952 and Longhurst in 1955 – synonymised many taxa, and resulted in the recognition of only 11 species in the two genera. This taxonomy was accepted for decades, "even attaining the status of dogma". More recent studies, especially those employing molecular phylogenetics, have shown that the eleven currently recognised species conceal a greater number of reproductively isolated populations.

Genera list 

 Strudops Strud locality, Belgium, late Devonian (Fammenian)
 Chenops Yixian Formation, China, Early Cretaceous (Aptian)
 Jeholops Yixian Formation, China, Early Cretaceous (Aptian)
 Weichangiops Dabeigou Formation, China, Early Cretaceous
 Brachygastriops Dabeigou Formation, China, Early Cretaceous
 Lynceites Germany, Canada, Carboniferous
 Xinjiangiops Kelamayi Formation, China, Middle Triassic

Incertae sedis species

 "Notostraca" minor (often referred to as Triops cancriformis minor, or "Triops" minor in historic literature) Hassberge Formation, Germany, Late Triassic (Carnian)
 "Notostraca" oleseni Yixian Formation, China, Early Cretaceous (Aptian)
 "Calmanostraca" hassbergella Hassberge Formation, Germany, Late Triassic (Carnian)

See also
 Trilobite

References

External links

 
 

 
Freshwater crustaceans
Cisuralian taxonomic orders
Crustacean orders
Early Cretaceous taxonomic orders
Early Jurassic taxonomic orders
Early Triassic taxonomic orders
Eocene taxonomic orders
Extant Carboniferous first appearances
Guadalupian taxonomic orders
Holocene taxonomic orders
Late Cretaceous taxonomic orders
Late Jurassic taxonomic orders
Late Triassic taxonomic orders
Lopingian taxonomic orders
Middle Jurassic taxonomic orders
Middle Triassic taxonomic orders
Miocene taxonomic orders
Oligocene taxonomic orders
Paleocene taxonomic orders
Pennsylvanian taxonomic orders
Pleistocene taxonomic orders
Pliocene taxonomic orders